Robin Sydney (born Robin Sydney Heymsfield; January 4, 1984) is an American actress.

Biography
Sydney began acting at the age of eight in local theater in her hometown of Boulder, Colorado. At age seventeen, she moved to Hollywood with her mother to pursue a screen career.

She appeared in the television series ER, Drake & Josh, Oliver Beene, Masters of Horror, The Brotherhood of Poland, New Hampshire, Femme Fatales and Chemistry. She has also appeared in the Charles Band-directed films The Gingerdead Man, Evil Bong, Dead Man's Hand, Evil Bong 2: King Bong, Skull Heads and Evil Bong 3D: The Wrath of Bong.

Besides acting, Sydney along with her mother Marian Heymsfield created the company Zorbitz in 2003. Through the Zorbitz company they sell a number of children's products in which they donate a portion of each sale to charities worldwide.

Filmography

Film

Television

References

External links
 
 

1984 births
21st-century American actresses
Actresses from Boulder, Colorado
American child actresses
American film actresses
American television actresses
Living people